John Charles Pratt, 3rd Marquess Camden DL (30 June 1840 – 4 May 1872), styled Viscount Bayham in 1840 and Earl of Brecknock between 1840 and 1866, was a British Liberal politician.

Camden was born at Belgrave Square, London, the eldest son of George Pratt, 2nd Marquess Camden, by Harriet, daughter of the Right Reverend George Murray, Bishop of Rochester. He was educated at Trinity College, Cambridge, graduating MA in 1860. In February 1866 he was returned to parliament for Brecon. However, in August of the same year he succeeded his father in the marquessate and entered the House of Lords.

Lord Camden married Lady Clementina Augusta, daughter of George Spencer-Churchill, 6th Duke of Marlborough, in 1866. They had three sons (of whom the two eldest died in infancy) and one daughter. He died at Eaton Square, London, in May 1872, aged 31, and was succeeded by his third but only surviving son, John, who was then two months old. The Marchioness Camden married as her second husband Captain Philip Green in 1876. She died in March 1886, aged 36.

References

External links

1840 births
1872 deaths
Alumni of Trinity College, Cambridge
John
Liberal Party (UK) MPs for Welsh constituencies
UK MPs 1865–1868
UK MPs who inherited peerages
3
Presidents of the Royal Archaeological Institute